.gn is the country code top-level domain (ccTLD) for Guinea. A local contact is required to register a domain name under .gn.

Second level domains

 .com.gn: Commercial
 .ac.gn: Academic
 .gov.gn: Government
 .org.gn: Non-profit
 .net.gn: Network infrastructure

References

External links
IANA .gn whois information
.gn domain registration website

Country code top-level domains
Communications in Guinea
Computer-related introductions in 1994

sv:Toppdomän#G